Bertram Otto Bardenhewer (Mönchengladbach, 16 March 1851 – Munich, 23 March 1935) was a German Catholic patrologist. His Geschichte der altkirchlichen Literatur is a standard work, re-issued in 2008. For Bardenhewer, a patrologist was not a literary historian of the Church Fathers, but a historian of dogmatic definitions.

Life

He was educated at the University of Bonn (Ph.D., 1873) and University of Würzburg, and in 1879 became privat-docent of theology at the University of Munich. In 1884 he accepted a call to Münster as professor of Old Testament. Two years later he returned to Munich, as a professor for New Testament exegesis and Biblical hermeneutics, a position he held to 1924.

Works
 Hermetis Trismegisti qui apud Arabes fertur de castigatione animæ libellus (Bonn, 1873)
 Des heiligen Hippolytus von Rom Kommentar zum Buche Daniel (Freiburg, 1877)
 Polychronius, Bruder Theodors von Mopsuestia and Bischof von Apamea (1879)
 Die pseudo-aristotelische Schrift über die reine Gute, bekannt unter dem Namen "Liber de Causis" (1882)
 Patrologie (1894)
 Geschichte der altkirchlichen Literatur (5 vols., 1902 to 1932).

Notes

External links
 

Herzog-Schaff source article 

1851 births
1935 deaths
19th-century German Catholic theologians
20th-century German Catholic theologians
University of Bonn alumni
Academic staff of the University of Münster
19th-century German male writers
19th-century German writers
German male non-fiction writers